Kusaki Dam  is a gravity dam located in Hyogo Prefecture in Japan. The dam is used for power production. The catchment area of the dam is 13.4 km2. The dam impounds about 7  ha of land when full and can store 248 thousand cubic meters of water. The construction of the dam was completed in 1913.

See also
List of dams in Japan

References

Dams in Hyogo Prefecture